The 1989–90 North West Counties Football League season was the eighth in the history of the North West Counties Football League, a football competition in England. Teams were divided into two divisions: Division One and Division Two.

Division One

Division One featured three new teams:

 Chadderton promoted as third in Division Two
 Nantwich Town promoted as fifth in Division Two
 Vauxhall GM promoted as champions of Division Two

League table

Division Two

Daisy Hill changed their name to Westhoughton Town

Division Two featured one new team:
 Formby relegated from Division One

League table

References

External links 
 NWCFL Official Site

North West Counties Football League seasons
8